Dimitrios Toskas (born 13 March 1991) is a Greek professional footballer who plays as a centre-back for Pierikos.

Career
Toskas started his professional career with Pierikos in 2008. In 2012, he moved to Cyprus to play for PAEEK. In January 2013 he signed for Greek Superleague club Panionios. He debuted for his new club in an away defeat against Aris. He appeared in all but two matches of his new club in his first season. He had to undergo surgery in the summer of 2013, due to a torn fibular ligament. He only appeared in one match during the season and was eventually released from the club in the summer of 2014.

On 7 August 2014 he signed a two-year contract with Iraklis. Toskas debuted for Iraklis in a cup match against Lamia.

References

External links

Myplayer.gr profile

1991 births
Living people
Iraklis Thessaloniki F.C. players
PAEEK players
Panionios F.C. players
Pierikos F.C. players
Greek footballers
Expatriate footballers in Cyprus
Super League Greece players
Cypriot Second Division players
Greek expatriate footballers
Greek expatriate sportspeople in Cyprus
Association football central defenders
Footballers from Katerini